Ashraf ministry is the cabinet of Pakistan from 2012 to 2013.

Cabinet members

References

2012 establishments in Pakistan
Cabinets established in 2012
2010s in Pakistan
2010s in politics